Pir Jad may refer to:
 Pirijed
 Pirjed
 Pirjad-e Pain